Jayaram is an Indian male given name. Due to the South Indian tradition of using patronymic surnames it may also be a surname for males and females.

Notable people

Given name
 Jayaram (Jayaram Subramaniam, born 1965), Indian actor
 Jayaram Jayalalithaa (1948–2016), Indian politician and actress 
 Jayaram Khadka (born 1972), Nepali skier 
 Jayaram Padikkal, Indian police officer
 Jayaram Pangi (born 1955), Indian politician
 Jayarama Reddiar, Indian politician
 Jayaram Shiledar (1915–1992), Indian actor and singer
 Jayaram K Udupa, Indian-American scientist

Surname
 Kalidas Jayaram, Indian actor
 Ajay Jayaram, Indian badminton player
 Atma Jayaram (1915–1990), Indian intelligence chief
 Gayatri Jayaraman, Indian actress
 Gummanur Jayaram (born 1968), Indian politician
 K. Jayaram, Indian photographer
 Jayaram K R, Indian politician
 Karthik Jayaram, Indian actor
 Kavin Jayaram (born 1980), Malaysian comedian
 Parvathy Jayaram (born 1970), Indian actress
 Poornima Jayaram (Poornima Bhagyaraj, born 1970), Indian actress
 Sai Jayalakshmy Jayaram (born 1977), Indian tennis player
 Udupi Jayaram (1929–2004), Indian choreographer
 Vani Jayaram, Indian singer

See also
 
 Jayaraman
 Jayaraj

Tamil masculine given names